Fabrício Carlos Costa Bento, also known as Fabrício Ceará, or simply Ceará,(born May 2, 1978 in Limoeiro do Norte) is a Brazilian football striker.

External links
sambafoot.fr profile
Belenenses Profile

1978 births
Living people
Brazilian footballers
Brazilian expatriate footballers
Expatriate footballers in Iran
Primeira Liga players
Criciúma Esporte Clube players
Esteghlal Ahvaz players
Guarani FC players
Paysandu Sport Club players
Santa Cruz Futebol Clube players
C.D. Santa Clara players
C.F. Os Belenenses players
Botafogo Futebol Clube (PB) players
Salgueiro Atlético Clube players
Esporte Clube Internacional de Lages players
Treze Futebol Clube players
Expatriate footballers in Portugal
Association football forwards
Sportspeople from Ceará